The Stadion der Freundschaft is a multi-purpose stadium in Frankfurt (Oder), Germany, with a capacity of 12,000.

History 
The stadium was built in commemoration of the 700th anniversary of the city of Frankfurt (Oder). The opening game in the stadium was a match between SG Dynamo Frankfurt and Gwardia-Wisła Kraków on 15 July 1953 in front of a record 25,000 fans.

International matches 
Before German reunification, the Stadion der Freundschaft hosted two friendlies of the East Germany national football team. After the fall of the Berlin Wall, the German Football Association staged two qualifying games for the UEFA European Under-21 Football Championships.

Athletics 
On 22 September 1968, the East German athlete Margitta Gummel recorded a shot put world record (18.87 metres) at the Stadion der Freundschaft.

Current status 
Nowadays the stadium is in a state of disrepair. The original floodlights as well as the scoreboard had to be taken down in 2000 due to a public safety risk.

References

External links 
 FFC Viktoria – Stadion der Freundschaft 

1. FC Frankfurt
Buildings and structures in Frankfurt (Oder)
Football venues in Germany
Athletics (track and field) venues in Germany
Freundschaft
Sports venues in Brandenburg
Sports venues completed in 1953
Sport in Frankfurt (Oder)